Narita Airport Station may refer to: 
 The Narita Airport Station()(1991–2015), now Narita Airport Terminal 1 Station
 The Keisei Narita Airport Station (1978–1991), now Higashi-Narita Station

See also
 Narita Airport Terminal 2·3 Station